Terry Wayne Tausch  (February 5, 1959 – March 25, 2020) was an American professional football player who was a guard in the National Football League (NFL).

Tausch played tight end on the New Braunfels High School football team. He was recruited by the University of Texas at Austin, where he played as an offensive tackle. He was an All-American in 1980 and 1981, and selected in 2001 for the Texas Athletics Hall of honor.

The Minnesota Vikings made Tausch a second-round draft choice in 1982 with the 39th overall draft pick.  He played seven seasons for Minnesota in 68 games at right guard and one season for the San Francisco 49ers when they won Super Bowl XXIV.

Terry and his wife, Ela, had two sons, Nicholas and Eric. Nicholas and Eric played college football at Notre Dame and TCU, respectively.

On March 25, 2020, Tausch died at his home in Plano, Texas at the age of 61.

References

1959 births
2020 deaths
All-American college football players
American football offensive linemen
Minnesota Vikings players
People from New Braunfels, Texas
Players of American football from Texas
Sportspeople from New Braunfels, Texas
San Francisco 49ers players
Texas Longhorns football players